B1G Super Saturday is an annual college sports doubleheader that is played between two basketball and two hockey or wrestling schools of the Big Ten Conference at Madison Square Garden that began in 2016. Michigan and Penn State participated in the inaugural Super Saturday event for both basketball and hockey. It is presented by Discount Tire.

Men's basketball

Past results

Future match-ups

Ice hockey

Past results

Wrestling

Past results

Future match-ups

References

2016 establishments in New York City
2016 in sports in New York City
2010s in Manhattan
Basketball competitions in New York City
Big Ten Conference ice hockey
Big Ten Conference men's basketball
Big Ten Conference wrestling
College men's basketball competitions in the United States
College sports in New York City
Madison Square Garden
Recurring sporting events established in 2016
Ice hockey competitions in New York City